Albert Smith (23 July 1869 – 18 April 1921) was an English international footballer, who played as a right half.

Career
Born in Nottingham, Smith played professionally for Notts County and Nottingham Forest, and earned three caps for England between 1891 and 1893.

References

External links

1869 births
1921 deaths
English footballers
England international footballers
Nottingham Forest F.C. players
Notts County F.C. players
English Football League players
Association football midfielders